Lee Morrison (born October 8, 1979 in Carmichael, California) is a retired American soccer player who last played as a defender for the Portland Timbers in USL First Division.

Club career
Morrison was picked by Dallas Burn in 2002 MLS SuperDraft from Stanford University.

In 2003, he signed with Portland Timbers, where he played for five seasons in USL First Division and A-League

International career
Morrison was part of the United States U20 that participated in the 1999 FIFA World Youth Championship.

References

External links
 

1979 births
Living people
American soccer players
Stanford Cardinal men's soccer players
FC Dallas players
Portland Timbers (2001–2010) players
Soccer players from California
Major League Soccer players
A-League (1995–2004) players
USL First Division players
United States men's youth international soccer players
FC Dallas draft picks
United States men's under-20 international soccer players
People from Carmichael, California
All-American men's college soccer players
Association football defenders
Sportspeople from Sacramento County, California